The National Center for Missing & Exploited Children (NCMEC) is a private, nonprofit organization established in 1984 by the United States Congress. In September 2013, the United States House of Representatives, United States Senate, and the President of the United States reauthorized the allocation of $40 million in funding for the National Center for Missing & Exploited Children as part of Missing Children's Assistance Reauthorization Act of 2013. The current chair of the organization is Jon Grosso of Kohls. NCMEC handles cases of missing or exploited children from infancy to young adults through age 20.

History
The National Center for Missing & Exploited Children was founded in 1984, spurred by notable child abductions such as the 1981 abduction and murder of six-year-old Adam Walsh from a shopping mall in Hollywood, Florida, and the 1979 abduction of six-year-old Etan Patz from New York City. Because police had the ability to record and track information about stolen cars, stolen guns, and even stolen horses with the FBI's national crime computer, it was believed that the same should be done to find child victims and the procurers who exploited them.

In 1984, the U.S. Congress passed the Missing Children's Assistance Act, which established a National Resource Center and Clearinghouse on Missing & Exploited Children. On June 13, 1984, the National Center for Missing & Exploited Children, formed by Adam Walsh's parents, Revé and John Walsh, alongside other children's advocates, was officially opened by President Ronald Reagan in a White House ceremony. The national 24-hour toll-free missing children's hotline, 1-800-THE-LOST, was also established.

Primarily funded by the United States Department of Justice, the NCMEC acts as an information clearinghouse and resource for parents, children, law enforcement agencies, schools, and communities to assist in locating missing children and to raise public awareness about ways to prevent child abduction, child sexual abuse and child pornography. John Walsh, Noreen Gosch, and others advocated establishing the center as a result of frustration stemming from a lack of resources and a national coordination between law enforcement and other government agencies.

The Center provides information to help locate children reported missing (by parental abduction, child abduction, or running away from home) and to assist physically and sexually abused children.  In this resource capacity, the NCMEC distributes photographs of missing children and accepts tips and information from the public.  It also coordinates these activities with numerous state and federal law enforcement agencies.

During the mid to late 1980s, the toy Teddy Ruxpin became the "Official Spokesbear" for the center at the height of his popularity. Due to this partnership, some stories featured extra information for kids to stay safe from abductions, sexual predators, etc. This also caused his animated series to feature a clip titled "Protect Yourself" in which safety information for kids would be given by then popular child actors.

In September 2013, the United States House of Representatives, United States Senate, and the President of the United States voted to reauthorize $40 million in funding for the National Center for Missing & Exploited Children as part of Missing Children's Assistance Reauthorization Act of 2013 (H.R. 3092; 113th Congress).

The Center not only specializes in locating missing children, but identifying the deceased.  There are a number of unidentified decedents in the country, some of which are children, teenagers and young adults. Like missing children, posters are created for the cases and, is possible, show forensic facial reconstructions of the subject that show an estimation of their appearance while alive. The reconstructions that the NCMEC creates have been regarded to be state-of-the-art and have been stated to have been mistaken for photographs.

On April 6, 2018, it was announced in Forbes magazine that the Department of Justice had seized and shut down the website of frequent nemesis of NCMEC, Backpage.com, on the grounds that it had frequently facilitated human trafficking. NCMEC released a statement: "The National Center for Missing & Exploited Children just learned that Backpage.com was seized by the FBI, IRS, and the U.S. Postal Inspection Service with analytical assistance from the Joint Regional Intelligence Center. This is another step in the years-long fight against the exploitation of child victims who were bought and sold for sex on Backpage.com. #NCMEC is waiting alongside the rest of the world to see what will come next. We stand by the victims and their families as they process this news and continue to fight for justice against those who profited from their abuse. #EndSexTrafficking."

Most recently, the Center supported the  PROTECT Our Children Act of 2022, which passed the United States Senate on November 15, 2022 as well as Congress on December 6, 2022. The act reauthorizes funding for the Internet Crimes Against Children Task Force (ICAC) and provides support to investigate and arrest perpetrators of sex offenses against children.

CyberTipline

The NCMEC operates the CyberTipline which was established by Congress to process reports of child sexual exploitation (including child pornography, online enticement, and contact offenses).  The NCMEC reviews these reports and shares them with the appropriate law enforcement agency or Internet Crimes Against Children (ICAC) task force.  In addition to the information provided by the reporting party, NCMEC typically adds geolocation information (if appropriate) and cross-references identifying information such as email address, username, or IP address with existing CyberTipline Reports.

Anyone can make a report to the CyberTipline but reporting is required for certain electronic service providers (ESP) who become aware of the presence of child pornography on their systems. While ESPs are not required to actively scan for or try to detect child pornography, many of them do.  In 2018, the CyberTipline processed 18.4 million reports.

Applications to the US seeking return of children

Effective September 5, 1995, applications seeking the return of or access to children in the US under the Hague Convention on the Civil Aspects of International Child Abduction were processed through the NCMEC for the US Department of State, Office of Children's Issues under contract with the US Department of State and the US Department of Justice. On April 1, 2008, the US Office of Children's Issues re-assumed U.S. Central Authority duties for processing incoming cases under the Hague Abduction Convention. As a result of its status as a government contractor as well as funding provided under the Missing Children Act and Missing Children's Assistance Act, the NCMEC received US$40-million funding each year from the US Government.

International
In 1998, the NCMEC Board of Directors approved the creation of a separate international organization, the International Centre for Missing & Exploited Children (ICMEC); the two now act as sister organizations. ICMEC combats child sexual exploitation, child pornography, and child abduction.  ICMEC held its first Board of Directors meeting in 1998. It was officially launched in April 1999.

According to data compiled by the National Center for Missing & Exploited Children, between 2011 and 2015, 45 percent of children reported missing in America were found after being missing between six and 11 months; 27 percent were found when missing for between one and two years; 19 percent when missing for between two and five years; 5 percent between six and 10 years; 3 percent when missing between 11 and 20 years; and only 1 percent of missing children and found when missing for over 20 years.

ICMEC runs a global missing children's network of 30 countries. ICMEC has trained law enforcement personnel from 121 countries, works with law enforcement in over 100 countries, and has worked with legislatures in 100 countries to adopt new laws combating child pornography. ICMEC also encourages the creation of national operational centers built on a public-private partnership model, and leads global financial and industry coalitions to eradicate child sexual exploitation and child pornography. The Koons Family Institute on International Law and Policy is the International Centre's research arm. In August 2008, ICMEC was granted "Special Consultative Status" by the United Nations Economic and Social Council (ECOSOC), to assist the UN with its expertise regarding child sexual exploitation and child abduction. ICMEC also works with the intergovernmental organization INTERPOL, the inter-continental organization the Organization of American States (the OAS), and the Hague Conference on Private International Law.

NCMEC is an associate of PACT Parents and Abducted Children Together in the United Kingdom.

iOS 15 controversy 
In 2021, the group faced criticism over a partnership with Apple to produce and implement monitoring software for iOS 15, intended to continuously monitor all users' iCloud photos uploaded as part of iCloud Photo Library "to confirm whether it contains child pornography"; the software would send any image to human reviewers that "matches one in the database of the [NCMEC]", and user data would be forwarded to NCMEC for law enforcement review. Users were not to be given an opportunity to opt out of the service, which was described as an unreasonable encroachment on privacy. Edward Snowden described the updated devices as "iNarcs", while the Electronic Frontier Foundation argued that such a backdoor would require little adaptation to monitor for other types of content, enabling political censorship by governments (who could potentially require Apple to enable such features once available). An editorial in The New York Times by Matthew D. Green and Alex Stamos said that, while many platforms (like Facebook, Google, and Microsoft) have screened public user uploads for a long time, Apple's promise to only evaluate photos which use its iCloud service was a policy decision, not a technological requirement limiting access to users' personal devices. In a company-wide internal letter to Apple employees in response to public opposition to the system, NCMEC’s executive director of strategic partnerships Marita Rodriguez described criticism as the "screeching voices of the minority."

Publications
In 2007, NCMEC and Duracell produced a children's book title The Great Tomato Adventure: A Story About Smart Safety Choices, along with a series of educational tools for parents and guardians of older children called Teachable Moments Guides. The books were produced and published by Arbor Books, and the foreword was written by Jada Pinkett Smith. Both tools were introduced as an extension of the child safety program that launched in 2006. The book was made available as a free download via the Power of Parents program website.

Notable board and staff members
John F. Clark, former President and CEO
Karen Tandy, former Board Chair
Revé Walsh, Co-Founder and Chair-Elect
John Walsh, Co-Founder
Dennis DeConcini, former United States Senator

See also

 AMBER Alert
 Association of Sites Advocating Child Protection (ASACP)
 Child abduction
 Child abduction alert system
 Child Focus
 Code Adam
 Federal Bureau of Investigation
 Financial Coalition Against Child Pornography
 International child abduction
 Kidnapping
 List of United States quangos
 National Child Victim Identification Program
 National Missing Children's Day
 United States Children's Bureau
 U.S. Secret Service
 Vanished Children's Alliance

References

External links
 
 
 The Global Missing Children's Network
 The Nest Foundation
 US Hotline reports vast improvements in removal of child abuse websites, EDRi-gram newsletter - Number 9.16, August 24, 2011

Non-profit organizations based in the United States
Sexual abuse victims advocacy
Child abduction in the United States
Child safety
Law enforcement in the United States
Missing people organizations
Person databases
Forensics organizations
Anti–child pornography organizations